Obages flavosticticus is a species of beetle in the family Cerambycidae. It was described by Stephan von Breuning in 1939. It is known from Malaysia.

It's 8 mm long and 2.5 mm wide, and its type locality is Perak.

References

Morimopsini
Beetles described in 1939
Taxa named by Stephan von Breuning (entomologist)